The European route E1 in Portugal is a series of roads, part of the International E-road network running on a north south axis on the west coast. It starts at the Spanish border in the north at Valença going almost perfectly south passing by several major Portuguese cities like Porto and Lisbon until the border with Spain again at Castro Marim.

Route 
The route starts at the border town of Valença at the Minho river coming from the Spanish city of Vigo in the Norte Region. It follows Portuguese highway A3 by Braga to the second largest city in Portugal Porto. From this coastal city on the Atlantic Ocean, the E1 goes southwest, using the A1 motorway to the Centro Region passing by the major cities of Coimbra and Leiria to the Portuguese capital Lisbon. The motorway passes through the city center, from where it takes the A2 motorway crossing the sparsely populated Alentejo Region all the way until the south coast in the Algarve region at the merge with the A22 motorway at Albufeira. The road goes then east passing by Faro to the Spanish border at the Guadiana river in the Portuguese village of Castro Marim. The E1 is one of the most important highways in Portugal as it connects several major cities north to south. The E1 covers a total distance of 748 km (465 mi) within Portugal.

Detailed route

General references 
https://ec.europa.eu/transport/themes/infrastructure/

Google Maps

References

Roads in Portugal
European routes by country